John Charles Marquez (born 5 June 1970) is a British actor and writer, best known for his role as PC Joseph Penhale in ITV drama series Doc Martin (2007–2022) and Ray Wilson in BBC One's drama In The Club (2014–2016).

Filmography
Una vida y dos mandados (1997) 
Jonathan Creek (1997) as Supermarket Manager
The Trial of Tony Blair (2007)
Doc Martin (2007–2022)
Hotel Babylon (2008)
In The Club (2014—2016)
Death in Paradise (2017)
Porridge (2017)
Britannia (2019)

Personal life
Marquez was born in Coventry, England. He is the brother of actor Martin Marquez and uncle of Ramona Marquez.

References

External links

1970 births
Living people
20th-century British male actors
English male television actors
21st-century British male actors
Male actors from Warwickshire
British people of Spanish descent
Actors from Coventry